Popoli is a comune and town in the province of Pescara in the Abruzzo region of Italy.

History
Though the site has not revealed significant Roman presence it appears in a ninth-century document as borgo di Pagus Fabianus. Its name in medieval Latin was Castrum Properi ("Waystation Fortress"), which name was recorded as early as 1016 as the property of Girardo, son of Roccone.  The castle above the town was built between 1000 and 1015 for Tidolfo, Bishop of Valva. In 1269 the Angevin ruler Charles I of Naples granted Popoli as a fief in the Cantelmo family, who held it, with its ducal title, until 1749. The fief passed to Leonardo di Tocco, Prince of Montemiletto, and his heirs, until feudality was abolished in the Regno in 1806.

Popoli was bombed twice during World War II by the Royal Air Force. On 20 January 1944, the most important bridge in the region, the "Julius Caesar" bridge connecting Rome with Pescara, was destroyed. On 22 March 1944 at noon the city center and city hall were destroyed by substantial bombing by the British. Unfortunately, it was a day that rations were being distributed to town at the city hall, and there were long lines of women and children, many of whom were killed or wounded. The day is still remembered with sorrow by the town's inhabitants.

Honors
Following World War II, the Italian Republic awarded the town of Popoli with the "Silver Medal of Civil Merit" (Medaglia d'argento al merito civile)
"Crucial center, occupied by German troops the day after the armistice, was subjected to repeated and violent bombardments which caused the deaths of ninety-one civilians and the destruction of nearly all of the public property.  The whole population knew how to react, with dignity and courage, to the horrors of war and to face, with the return of peace, the difficult works of moral and material reconstruction."—Popoli (PE), 1943–1944

Main sights
The town and the surrounding area have several objects of interest: 
 The Taverna Ducale from the mid 14th century ranks among the most beautiful secular medieval buildings in Abruzzo.
 Torre de' Passeri 
 The abbey of San Clemente a Casauria (12th century )
 The church of San Francesco, was begun in the 15th century
 The church of Santissima Trinità (1562) with an altar and a wooden choir from 1745
 The area around the springs which are the source of the Aterno river is a regionally protected area with the spa
 The castle ruin above Popoli

Festivals
The main festivity is in August. The historical parade with people dressed in  costume is held in celebration of historical event of the city (1495). The parade is followed by a fair, called "Certamen de la Balestra".  Strength and ability are necessary for the knight to win the Certamen or the grand prize.

Notable natives
General Corradino D'Ascanio

References
This article is based in part on material from the German Wikipedia.

Further reading
 Damiani,  Fernando (1975) La città di Popoli: memorie storiche ed artistiche (The town of Popoli: Historical and Artistic Memoir) Di Cioccio, Sulmona, Italy, in Italian
 Di Donato, Ugo (1980) Popoli e i Popolesi (Popoli and the People of Popoli) Fracasso,  Popoli, Italy, in Italian
 Hamilton, Mary and Nodier, Charles (1810) La famille du duc de Popoli: mémories de M. de Cantelmo, son frere (The Family of the Duke of Popoli: A Memoir of Monsieur de Cantelmo, his Brother) P. Didot l'áiné, Paris, in French

References

External links

 "Popoli" Abruzzo 2000

 
Cities and towns in Abruzzo
Spa towns in Italy